The Space Access Society (SAS) is an organization dedicated to increasing the viability and reducing the cost of commercial access to space travel. It was founded by Henry Vanderbilt, who was the president from the organizations' founding in 1992 until January 2006.

Activities
The SAS is primarily noted for two activities:
 Space policy activity and review reports, known as SAS updates, which were emailed and web posted at irregular intervals.  These included both factual current events and policy analysis, and were largely or entirely written by Henry Vanderbilt.
 Space Access conferences, held in the spring in Phoenix, Arizona, from 1994 to 2016. In 2019, the event to place in Fremont, California. There was also a Making Orbit conference held in Berkeley, California in 1992.

The Space Access conferences are well known in the reusable space launch development community and space launch vehicle communities for bringing together key players at most of the companies working in the field, ranging from large conventional aerospace companies such as Boeing and Lockheed-Martin, and smaller companies such as Rotary Rocket, XCOR Aerospace, Pioneer Rocketplane, Armadillo Aerospace and the like.  NASA and the Federal Aviation Administration Office of Commercial Space Transportation also have consistently sent representatives.   Many Ansari X-Prize team members were consistent attendees.

Presentations at the conference range from informal to viewgraphs and paper handouts.  There is no conference proceedings, to encourage the free discussion of issues which participants may not want to go on documented record.  Social networking among the industry leaders present is a major feature of the conferences as well.

See also
Private spaceflight
Space advocacy
Space colonization
Space exploration
Vision for Space Exploration

References 

heise.de coverage of Space Access 2016 Conference held in Phoenix, Arizona
HobbySpace.com coverage of Space Access 2008 Conference, Phoenix, Arizona
HobbySpace.com coverage of Space Access 2007 Conference, Phoenix, Arizona
HobbySpace.com coverage of Space Access 2006 Conference, Phoenix, Arizona

External links
Official website

Non-profit organizations based in the United States
Space colonization
Space advocacy organizations
Space access